Lincoln University College, Petaling Jaya, Malaysia, was founded in the year in 2002 as Lincoln College and in 2011 Lincoln College was upgraded to Lincoln University College. Lincoln University College is a private institution that provides higher education, approved by the Malaysian Qualifications Agency (MQA, National Accreditation Board) and the Ministry of Higher Education. The University College has got 5 Star ranking by Ministry of Higher Education, Malaysia in 2017 and 2019. Lincoln University College among the nine Malaysian universities listed in the Times Higher Education (THE) University Impact Rankings 2019 ranked 80th in Quality Education provider in 2020 TIMES ranking . Lincoln University College got ISO 9001:2015 Certification in 2019. Situated in the cosmopolitan town of Petaling Jaya, the university college is close to the capital city, Kuala Lumpur.

At present Lincoln University College has two campuses in Petaling Jaya, along with its clinical campus at Kota Bharu.

List of Faculties 

 Faculty of Medicine and Health Sciences
 Faculty of Dentistry
 Faculty of Pharmacy
 Faculty of Drama Studies
 Faculty of Nursing
 Faculty of Business and Accounting
 Faculty of Hospitality
 Faculty of Computer Science and Multimedia
 Faculty of Engineering
 Faculty of Science
 Faculty of Social Science, Arts & Humanities
 English Language Centre & Centre for General Studies
 Centre for Foundation Studies

Foreign Collaborations 

Lincoln University College has collaborations with many international Colleges and Universities:
 Huddersfield University, UK
 Hertfordshire University, UK
 Haaga-Helia University, Finland
 University of London, UK
 University of Kentucky, USA
 Missouri University - Columbia, USA
 California State University, USA
 KFA Business School & IT, Nepal
 Nepal Business College, Biratnagar, Nepal
 Phoenix College of Management, Nepal
 College of Information Management and Sciences (CIMS), Sri Lanka
 Nepal Lincoln Academy Pvt. Ltd., Nepal
 SIMAD University, Somalia
 Texas College of Management, Nepal
 National Employment Training Centre Pvt. Ltd., Nepal
 Lincoln International College of Management and IT, Nepal
 Academy of Culinary arts and Hospitality Management, Nepal
 Pokhara Lincoln International College, Nepal
 Yala Peak College of Business Management, Nepal
 Western Mega College, Nepal
 Balmiki Lincoln College, Nepal
 Green Peace Lincoln College, Nepal
 EAST AFRICA UNIVERSITY SOMALIA
 National College of Management and Technical Science, Nepal
 University of Hormuud, Somalia
 Alpha University, Somalia
 Win-Stone School of Culinary Art, Sri Lanka
 Lincoln College Pvt. Ltd., Sri Lanka
 Mahan Sanjesh (Sary), Iran
 IIPD Maldives
 Akper Helvetia Medan, Indonesia
 Sekolah Tinggi Ilmu Ekonomi LMII Medan, Indonesia
 Southeast University, Bangladesh
 Yayasan Mitra Edukasi Global, Indonesia
 River Samon Institute of Management, Myanmar
  Trinity International College, Myanmar
 TEFL Language School Phuket, Thailand
 Stratford University, USA
 Texas Wesleyan University, USA
 University of California, Riverside, Extension, USA
 RMIT University, Australia
 KASP Learning Campus,  Sri Lanka
 Brainware University,  India
 Brainware Consultancy Pvt. Ltd.,  India
 Success Path Educational Consultancy Pvt. Ltd.,  Nepal
Sri Lanka Foundation Institute, Sri Lanka
 Northshore college (LUC Sri Lanka Branch Campus)

External links 
 

Private universities and colleges in Malaysia
Colleges in Malaysia
Universities and colleges in Selangor
Educational institutions established in 2002
2002 establishments in Malaysia